Ya Foy! is Sarazino's 2009 release on the independent label Cumbancha. The world music album features Toots Hibbert, of Toots and the Maytals, as well as African singer Revelino. The album features influence from various genres such as reggae, Latin music, hip-hop, and African funk.

Track list

References

External links
Exclaim! review
The Australian review
Album on AllMusic

World music albums by Algerian artists
2009 albums